Domingo Martinez is an American author best known for his memoirs The Boy Kings of Texas (published 2012) and My Heart Is a Drunken Compass (published 2014). The Boy Kings of Texas was a finalist in the non-fiction category in the 2012 National Book Award contest. These books describe his difficult childhood in Brownsville, Texas, as well as his later struggles as an adult. Martinez found writing these books cathartic and used the writing as a healing process to deal with his feelings and emotions.

References 

Mexican-American culture in Texas
American memoirists
American male non-fiction writers
Writers from Texas
Hispanic and Latino American writers
People from Brownsville, Texas
Living people
Year of birth missing (living people)
American writers of Mexican descent